Alexander L. Bond is a Canadian conservation biologist, ecologist, and curator. He is a senior curator at the Natural History Museum at Tring and a researcher at the Institute for Marine and Antarctic Studies.

Education 
Bond completed a B.Sc. with honors in biology from Mount Allison University in 2005 and published a thesis titled Daytime spring migrations of scoters (Melanitta spp.) in the Bay of Fundy. He earned an M.Sc. from University of New Brunswick in 2007. His thesis was entitled Patterns of mercury burden in the seabird community of Machias Seal Island, New Brunswick. Bond completed a Ph.D. in 2011 at Memorial University of Newfoundland. His thesis there was called Relationships between oceanography and the demography & foraging of auklets (Charadriiformes, Alcidae: Aethia; Merrem 1788) in the Aleutian Islands. He was a NSERC Visiting Fellow in Government Laboratories, Environment and Climate Change Canada, Canada from 2013 – 2014 and a NSERC post-doctoral fellow at the University of Saskatchewan from 2011 to 2013.

Career 
Bond is a conservation biologist with a focus on the marine environment and island biology. His current specialisations include conservation, contaminants, invasive species, plastic, seabirds and stable isotopes. He was a NSERC visiting fellow at Environment and Climate Change Canada from 2013 to 2014. From 2014 to 2017, he was a senior conservation scientist for the Royal Society for the Protection of Birds at the Centre for Conservation Science. Bond was an adjunct professor at the University of Saskatchewan School of Environment and Sustainability from 2014 to 2019. He is an honorary researcher at the Institute for Marine and Antarctic Studies and is a primary research member of the Adrift Lab, both based in Tasmania, Australia. Bond is a senior curator of birds in the department of life sciences at the Natural History Museum at Tring.

Since 2012, Bond is a subject editor of Avian Conservation and Ecology.

Since 2013, Bond has written and blogged on science and Queer in STEM topics using the name The Lab and Field; he also uses this name on Twitter. He is part of the 500 Queer Scientists campaign, and co-chair and administrator of LGBTQ+ STEM. In 2020 Alex shared the Royal Society Athena Prize for his work with LGBTQ+ STEM. In 2020, he took part in the inaugural QatCanSTEM colloquium at Dalhousie University in Canada.

Bond is most noted for his work on plastic pollution in oceans and especially the health effects on seabirds.

Personal life 
Due to being gay, Bond and his partner decided to not pursue graduate school or positions located in the United States, opting instead for Canada or the United Kingdom.

References

External links 
 
 

Living people
Year of birth missing (living people)
Place of birth missing (living people)
Canadian LGBT scientists
Mount Allison University alumni
University of New Brunswick alumni
Memorial University of Newfoundland alumni
Academic staff of the University of Tasmania
Employees of the Natural History Museum, London
Canadian curators
Canadian ecologists
Conservation biologists
21st-century Canadian biologists
Canadian expatriate academics in the United Kingdom
Canadian expatriates in Australia
Canadian expatriates in England
Gay academics
Gay scientists
21st-century Canadian LGBT people
Canadian gay writers
Canadian male non-fiction writers
Canadian science writers
Canadian LGBT academics